Bonnie Baker may refer to:
 Bonnie Baker (baseball)
 Bonnie Baker (singer)